Grupo Folha is the second largest Brazilian media conglomerate, after Grupo Globo. It was founded by Octávio Frias (1912–2007) and led by his son Luiz Frias since 1992.

The group publishes Folha de S.Paulo, the largest circulation paper in the country, which since 1986 keeps the leadership among quality general-interest newspapers in Brazil. In the last decade, the group nearly tripled its revenue, getting to R$2.7 billion in 2010. EBITDA reached R$600 million in 2011.

Newspapers 

In February 2012, Folha widened its lead among prestige newspapers in Brazil, with an average of 297.5 thousand monthly copies in circulation, 12% ahead of O Globo and 20.3% ahead of O Estado de S. Paulo, competitors in Rio de Janeiro and São Paulo states. Besides Folha, the group publishes Agora São Paulo newspaper and has 50% shares at Valor Econômico, in partnership with Organizações Globo. Both are circulation leaders, respectively, in popular journalism and business journalism markets.

Internet and IT 
Folha did the first real-time online newspaper in 1995, also a market leader among Brazilian news websites, with 232.8 million pageviews in March 2012. Amount of unique visitors was 19.2 million that month (audience measured by Omniture, which also provides metrics for Apple and CNN).

UOL, controlled by Grupo Folha, is the leading Brazilian company for Web content and services, with 27.8 million unique visitors and about 4.3 billion pageviews every month. Launched in April 1996, UOL offered both Web access and content in a single package, becoming the leading ISP in the country. Later, it also specialized as an IT company, acting in ecommerce and epayments, gaming, dating websites, datacenters and IT solutions. In December 2010, UOL concluded the acquisition of Diveo Broadband Networks, becoming the third largest IT infrastructure services company in Latin America.

By the end of 2011, the group closed UOL's capital, buying back more than 17 million shares from minority shareholders and reaching more than 74% stock ownership; the group of shareholders led by businessman João Alves de Queiroz Filho, controller of the holding Hypermarcas, remained as a minority shareholder at UOL, with 25% of shares. Grupo Folha keeps the management.

Printing, logistics, polling and books 

Grupo Folha owns business units Transfolha (logistics) and Folhagráfica (printing). It also owns shares at Plural (printing) and SPDL (logistics).

Plural, a 50-50 joint-venture with Quad/Graphics controlled by Grupo Folha, is the main graphic industry with offset printing presses in South America. SPDL is a partnership between Folha (50%) and Estado (50%) groups, which distributes the newspapers by both companies.

Grupo Folha also owns Datafolha, one of the leading polling institutes in Brazil; Publifolha press, which sold more than one million books in 2010; Três Estrelas imprint, released in 2012 to publish humanities books; and Folhapress newswire.

New platforms 

The group's business strategy has increased the production and distribution of journalistic content designed to new technological formats, from tablets (like the iPad and Galaxy) to mobile phones, as well as in social media.

In 2012, the paper began producing and broadcasting at São Paulo's TV Cultura the newscast TV Folha, aired every Sunday at 8PM. On its first show, on 11 March 2012, the show was seen in 60,000 homes in São Paulo metropolitan area, according to Ibope ratings.

Grupo Folha Companies

News
 Folha de S. Paulo: newspaper, with presence on the Web and mobile platforms;
 TV Folha: online TV news and weekly TV show at TV Cultura, in São Paulo;
 F5: celebrity and entertainment news website;
 Folha Internacional: Folha's news content in English and Spanish;
 Agora São Paulo: popular newspaper;
 Valor Econômico: Grupo Folha has 50% participation at the leading business newspaper in Brazil, in society with Grupo Globo.
 Guia Folha: weekly cultural guide from São Paulo city, with special editions for books and movies;
 revista: weekly feature magazine about;
 revista Serafina: monthly feature magazine;
 Revista da Hora: weekly cultural guide included in Agora newspaper;
 Alô Negócios: classified ads newspaper circulating only in Paraná state;
 Folhapress: newswire; gathers news and sells pictures, articles, columns, drawings and graphic devices daily, both from the editorial content produced by Folha de S.Paulo, Agora São Paulo and other Grupo Folha companies and from partners;
 Acervo Folha: Digital archive of Grupo Folha newspaper editions since 1921;
 Banco de Dados Folha: Folha's database;

Books
 Publifolha: Grupo Folha's book-publishing division, created in 1995; has released more than 1,000 titles and currently has 600 books in print. Publifolha concentrates on the news, tourism, languages, general reference, children's tales and cooking areas. It is currently the leading travel guide publisher in Brazil, thanks mainly to the “Visual Guide” series, which offers information about countries, cities and regions, with travel itineraries and leisure suggestions for tourists.
 Três Estrelas: book imprint created in 2012 covering the non-fiction field, with books on journalism, communication, history, politics, sociology, economics, philosophy, psychoanalysis, scientific information and biography. The imprint's name was inspired by the three stars that accompany the logo of Folha de S.Paulo, the flagship newspaper published by the company that owns the imprint.
 Livraria da Folha: online bookstore

Printing
 Plural Editora e Gráfica: a joint-venture between Grupo Folha – to which newspaper Folha de S. Paulo belongs – and American printing conglomerate Quad/Graphics, the largest private printing company in the world. Plural, headquartered at Santana de Parnaíba (Greater São Paulo), started its operations in 1996.
 Folha Gráfica:

Logistics
 Transfolha (Magazines and Newspapers' Transportation Company); Transfolha is the Grupo Folha unit responsible for transporting and delivering print products (newspapers and magazines) as well as e-commerce parcels. It operates in 780 Brazilian cities and towns, both on behalf of Grupo Folha and for third parties. Currently, Transfolha has a monthly average throughput of 5.2 million newspapers, 650,000 magazines and 675,000 e-commerce parcels.
 SPDL: São Paulo Distribuição e Logística, a 50–50 newspaper distribution partnership with otherwise competitor Grupo Estado;

Polling
 Datafolha;

IT, web content and ecommerce
 Folha's website and mobile apps
 UOL: Universo Online: Internet content and service provider;
 UOL BoaCompra
 UOL Diveo
 UOL Host
 UOL Megastore
 UOL Links
 Shopping UOL 
 BoldCron
 Colorcube Games
 Dualtec
 Pagseguro UOL
 Uni5.com
 Emprego certo
 Cobre Direto
 Todo Desconto
 Zipmail
 Livraria da Folha
 DHC
 Metade Ideal
 Toda Oferta
 NotaNet
 Radar de Descontos

See also
Arne Ragnar Enge

References

External links
Grupo Folha – Institutional

 
Mass media companies of Brazil
1921 establishments in Brazil
Publishing companies established in 1921